Rishtey may refer to:

 Rishtey (film), a 2002 Indian Hindi drama film
 Rishtey (TV series), a Zee TV television series
 Rishtey (TV channel), rebranded as Colors Rishtey

See also
Reshte, a type of noodles